Denis Anthony Handlin AO (born 1951) is an Australian former entrepreneur and business executive who served as Chairman and Chief Executive Officer of Sony Music Entertainment Australia and New Zealand and President of Sony Music Entertainment Asia Inc, commencing employment in the company in 1970 until 5 June 2021, making him the longest serving global Sony Music employee.

Additionally, Handlin has served on the committees of several industry associations and has held various positions including Chairman of the Phonographic Performance Company of Australia, Vice Chairman of the Australian Recording Industry Association (ARIA) and Chairman of the ARIA Industry Chart Committee and has been a member of the ARIA Board from 1984 until 5 June 2021.

In October 2021, the Australian current affairs television program Four Corners interviewed over 100 Sony Music employees who alleged abuse, intimidation and bullying perpetrated by Handlin.

Early life and education
Handlin was born in Brisbane in 1951 and educated at St Joseph's College, Gregory Terrace.

Career
In May 1970, Handlin started in the Distribution Division within the Australian Record Company (later known as CBS Records International, Sony BMG now Sony Music Australia).

In 1976, Handlin moved to Sydney and held numerous senior positions including National Promotions Manager, Director of Marketing and General Manager, Marketing and Sales.

On 1 January 1985, Handlin was appointed Managing Director and Chief Executive Officer of the Australian company.

In February 1996, Handlin was made Chairman of Sony Music Entertainment Australia Limited and appointed to the international committee responsible for the company's global strategy.

In May 1996, Handlin became the first Australian and the first Sony Music Entertainment executive to be honoured with the CEO Special Recognition Award presented by Sony Chairman and CEO Norio Ohga.

In 2002, Handlin was appointed to chair the Sony Music International Strategy committee.

In 2005 at the Australia Day Honours List, Handlin was awarded the Member of the Order of Australia (AM) in recognition of "service to the music industry, particularly through the promotion of Australian musicians, to professional organisations, and to the community through fundraising for charitable organisations".

In September 2010, in addition to his Australia and New Zealand responsibilities, Handlin was appointed President, South East Asia & Korea and was further expanded as President, Asia in August 2011.

In November 2012, Handlin was elected to the position of Vice Chairman of the International Federation of the Phonographic Industry (IFPI) Asia Regional Board and in November 2014, Handlin was elected as Chairman of the IFPI Asia Pacific Board.

In October 2014, a Sony Foundation event was held to recognise Denis' 30 years leading Sony Music Australia. The event raised funds to create a special endowment fund to provide annual grants to support children with disabilities.

In June 2017 at the Queen's Birthday Honours List, Handlin was elevated to and awarded the Officer of the Order of Australia (AO), in recognition of "for distinguished service to the Australian recording industry, through leadership and mentoring roles, as a supporter of young artists, and to charitable organisations as a director, patron and contributor".

In February 2018, Handlin was announced as "the Number 1 most influential figure in the Australian music industry" by music industry publication, The Music.

On 21 June 2021, it was announced that Handlin was leaving the company. His departure was effective immediately and was announced by Sony Music's global boss Rob Stringer in an internal email. As he no longer worked at Sony Music, he could no longer be on the ARIA board and exited immediately.

Bullying and harassment allegations
In October 2021, the Australian current affairs television program Four Corners aired interviews with Sony Music employees who alleged abuse, intimidation and bullying perpetrated by Handlin during his years in charge at Sony Music Australia. Handlin was alleged to have routinely singled out members of staff for humiliation and intimidation, which left many "traumatised" and resulted in rates of close to 50 per cent annual turnover of staff at the company by the late 1990s. Former head of human resources at Sony Music Australia Greg Lockhart likened working under Handlin to being a "servant" who did not work for Sony Music but rather "Handlin and the 'cult' of his personality".

Despite fostering the careers of such female artists as Delta Goodrem, Handlin was alleged to have encouraged a "laddish" culture where female employees were regularly objectified, with Handlin himself alleged to have made sexualised comments about their appearances. He is also alleged to have ordered employees to be fired for "not smiling at him", because he did not like the "look" of them, or for being pregnant, with seven women made redundant while on maternity leave in the period between 2007 and 2013, and "paid cash settlements" following their termination from the company. Lockhart also alleged he was instructed by Handlin to hire private investigators to follow staff. Several anonymous former female employees also alleged they were sexually harassed and assaulted during their time at the company. Handlin said in a statement that while in charge of the company he "would never tolerate treating women in an inappropriate or discriminatory manner" and when informed of incidents, he "took action to ensure that it was stopped and didn't occur again".

Handlin was previously suspended by the Sony Music head office in 1998, with 10 executives flown out to Sony Music's global headquarters in New York City for one-on-one interviews regarding Handlin's conduct. Handlin was reinstated three months later, after which the alleged bullying, harassment and routine humiliation of Sony Music Australia staff continued; nine of the 10 interviewed executives left the company within four years. Due to this, Lockhart called Sony Music's global headquarters' claim it only found out about Handlin's behaviour in 2021 "implausible", and called for the "global head office [to] be held accountable for ignoring the welfare of its Australian staff for decades".

Personal life
Handlin married his wife Jan in 1977 and together they have six children.

Handlin has been a mentor of the Queensland State of Origin series rugby league team since 2006.

Awards and achievements
Handlin has been honored with several awards for his work in the Australian entertainment industry.

{| class="wikitable"
|-
!Year
!Nominee
!Ceremony
!Award
!Result
! 
|-
|1996
|Denis Handlin 
|Sony Music Entertainment
|CEO Special Recognition Award
|
|
|-
|2005
|Denis Handlin 
|Queen's Birthday Honours
|Member of the Order of Australia
|
|
|-
|2009
|Denis Handlin 
|APRA Awards (Australia)
|Ted Albert Award for Outstanding Services to Australian Music
|
|
|-
|2012
|Denis Handlin 
|Worldwide Radio Summit Industry Awards
|Label Executive of the Year – Major
|
|
|-
|2014
|Denis Handlin 
|ARIA Music Awards
|Icon Awards
| 
|
|-
|2017
|Denis Handlin 
|Queen's Birthday Honours
|Officer of the Order of Australia
|
|
|-
|2020
|Denis Handlin 
|Queensland Music Awards
|QMusic Honorary Award
|
|
|-

References

External links
 

1951 births
Businesspeople from Queensland
Officers of the Order of Australia
People educated at St Joseph's College, Gregory Terrace
Living people